Cuatro contra el crimen (English: "Four Against the Crime") is a 1968 Mexican action crime film directed by Sergio Véjar and starring Libertad Leblanc, Pedro Armendáriz Jr., Guillermo Murray, and Blanca Sánchez. Gabriel García Márquez contributed to the script.

Plot
After the death of two heads of a criminal organization, four secret agents are commissioned to protect a third boss.

Cast
Libertad Leblanc as Nora
Pedro Armendáriz Jr. as Gustavo
Guillermo Murray as Enrique Ferrer
Blanca Sánchez as Elena
Héctor Godoy as Pablo
Víctor Junco as Iván
Fernando Luján as Peter
Cynthia Mandan as Virginia Lascuráin
Rubén Calderón as Chief
Carlos Nieto as Luigi
Roberto Y. Palacios as Chang
Carlos León as Enrique Williams
Julián de Meriche as Mr. Cortés (uncredited)
Felipe del Castillo as Monk (uncredited)
Jesús Gómez as Villain in Helicopter (uncredited)
Ramiro Orci as Gas Station Attendant (uncredited)
Ivan J. Rado as Smith (uncredited)
Manuel Trejo Morales as Fake Monk (uncredited)
Marcelo Villamil as Mr. Lascuráin (uncredited)

Reception
In Breve historia del cine mexicano: primer siglo, 1897–1997, Emilio García Riera cited the film as an example, alongside S.O.S. Conspiración Bikini (1967) and El asesino se embarca (1967), of Mexican films made in the 1960s to cash in on the success of the James Bond films, referring to them as examples of "underdeveloped James Bond-ism."

References

External links

1968 films
1960s Spanish-language films
1960s crime action films
Mexican action films
Mexican crime films
1960s Mexican films